Darren Michael Langdon (born January 8, 1971) is a Canadian ice hockey coach and former professional player. Undrafted, he signed his first professional contract in 1993 with the New York Rangers. After retiring from the NHL, Langdon coached a former team, the Corner Brook Royals of the Newfoundland Senior Hockey League, until the team folded in the summer of 2016. While playing in the NHL, Langdon was best known for his hockey fighting ability as an enforcer.

Playing career
Langdon began his professional career with the Dayton Bombers of the ECHL, where he held the record for most penalty minutes in a season. He then played with Binghamton Rangers of the AHL, the farm team for the New York Rangers.

Langdon played in 521 NHL games. His NHL totals were 16 goals and 23 assists for 39 points and 1,251 penalties in minutes, with more than half coming in fighting majors. He played for the New York Rangers, Montreal Canadiens, New Jersey Devils, Carolina Hurricanes and Vancouver Canucks. Langdon was selected in 1996 and 1997 as winner of the Rangers' Players’ Player Award, voted on by his teammates.

Langdon retired from playing in the senior hockey circuit at age 43 after eight seasons to move behind the bench as coach of the Corner Brook Royals. Langdon has also played with the Deer Lake Red Wings of the WCSHL and played one season with the Summerside Western Capitals in the Maritime Junior A Hockey League. He played for and coached Deer Lake during the 2004-05 NHL lockout and helped the club to a Herder Memorial Trophy.

In 2015, Langdon was inducted into the Newfoundland and Labrador Hockey Hall of Fame.

Fighting

During Langdon's time in New York he often worked protecting star Wayne Gretzky. He was primarily a second half fighter who would dodge the first 10-15 punches before unloading.

Some significant feats of Langdon's fighting career include:
A rivalry with Toronto Maple Leafs player Tie Domi. They fought a total of four times.
Two bouts with "Bruise Brothers" member Bob Probert.
Four fights with New York Islanders and Ottawa Senators' Zdeno Chára.

Personal life
Langdon married his high school sweetheart, Jillian, in 1997. They have four children, three of them being triplets. The Langdons reside in Deer Lake, Newfoundland and Labrador, where Langdon coaches his sons Drew and Brett high school hockey team, the Elwood Regional High Lakers. He is also the minor hockey coach for their midget team. In 2007, Langdon stood for nomination as the Progressive Conservative candidate in a February 2007 by-election in the Humber Valley district. He opened Langer's, a bar decorated with his hockey memorabilia in Deer Lake. Some of the memorabilia include three Wayne Gretzky sticks, a signed No. 99 jersey, multiple pucks. and items from every one of his former New York teammates. He was affectionately called a weasel because of the sheer magnitude of items he had collected. He comes from a large family; his father is from a family of 17, his mother, a family of 13.

Career statistics

Regular season and playoffs

References

External links

1971 births
Living people
Anaheim Bullfrogs players
Canadian ice hockey left wingers
Carolina Hurricanes players
Ice hockey people from Newfoundland and Labrador
Montreal Canadiens players
New Jersey Devils players
New York Rangers players
People from Deer Lake, Newfoundland and Labrador
Undrafted National Hockey League players
Vancouver Canucks players